Dhruv Baker is a British cook and was named winner of BBC One's MasterChef competition in 2010.

Early life
Baker was born in Mexico to an English father and Indian mother. After completing secondary school he moved to England to study for a degree in Business and Spanish at Birmingham University. Although he started his career in media sales, he gave up his job to enter MasterChef.

Career
Since winning MasterChef 2010, Dhruv has become co-owner of catering company called Earlsfield Kitchen and the Jolly Gardeners pub in Earlsfield, London.

Publications
 Spice: Layers of Flavour (2014)

References

External links
The Jolly Gardeners

Living people
British chefs
Mexican chefs
English television chefs
Reality cooking competition winners
Year of birth missing (living people)